Villers-Sir-Simon is a commune in the Pas-de-Calais department in the Hauts-de-France region of France.

Geography

Population

Places of interest

 Commemorative stone to the American aviators who died when their plane crashed nearby on 27 August 1943.
 The church of St. Eloi, dating from the nineteenth century.

See also
Communes of the Pas-de-Calais department

References

External links

 Official website of the Communauté de communes 
 The war memorials

Villerssirsimon